The College of Science at the California State Polytechnic University, Pomona (Cal Poly Pomona) offers majors in nine fields leading to bachelor of science degree.

Admissions

Teacher Education and Professional Development
The College of Science offers numerous programs for preparing teachers of mathematics and science. The College sponsors numerous professional development programs for pre-K through grade 12 teachers.

Center for Education and Equity in Mathematics, Science and Technology (CEEMaST)
CEEMaST contributes to the improvement of science and mathematics education in preschool, elementary and secondary schools. It conducts workshops and courses for teachers, consults with local schools and districts, and maintains an instructional materials library for K-12 teachers' use.

Science Educational Enhancement Services (SEES)
SEES provides educational services for students enrolled in the College of Science who are first-generation college students, unfamiliar with a university environment, or for those students who can benefit from working with the faculty and other students to strengthen their connection to the University and enhance their ability to succeed academically.

Academic Excellence Workshops
An Academic Excellence Workshops is a supplement to certain beginning level chemistry, mathematics, computer science, physics and engineering courses which is open by invitation only. Participants in MEP in the College of Engineering and SEE in the College of Science receive priority consideration. The Workshop program promotes technical excellence in the subject area while also developing student and communication skills under the guidance of a trained facilitator.

References

External links
 

California State Polytechnic University, Pomona